Dairago ( or) is a comune (municipality) in the Metropolitan City of Milan in the Italian region Lombardy, located about  northwest of Milan.

Dairago borders the following municipalities: Busto Arsizio, Legnano, Magnago, Villa Cortese, Buscate, Busto Garolfo, Arconate.

References

External links
 Official website

Cities and towns in Lombardy